Coprosma rigida, is a shrub that is native to New Zealand. C. rigida grows to 4 metres high and is found in shady, damp forest areas with poor drainage. Typical habitat for it is on river banks and forest edges.

Coprosma rigida produces yellow fruit.

References

rigida
Flora of New Zealand
Plants described in 1887
Taxa named by Thomas Frederic Cheeseman